Manor of Madre de Deus is a historic former residence of the Bettencourt family in the civil parish of Sé, in the municipality of Angra do Heroísmo, in the Portuguese archipelago of the Azores.

History

The manor was constructed by the Majorat and Captain-major of Angra, João de Bettencourt de Vasconcelos (an extended member of the Bettencourt family) in the second half of the 17th century, from a small residence whose principal facade was oriented towards the east (now the wall dividing the dining-room in the principal edifice).

João de Bettencourt de Vasconcelos, along with his brother-in-law, Captain-major Francisco Ornelas da Câmara (who presided over the local Military War Council) used this building in 1641 during their blockade of the fortress of São João Baptista, and carved-out trenches around the building in order to defend the site.

Following years of political instability, the site became a centre of equestrianism on Terceira, with various redoubts and ring, supporting and teaching several famous bullfighters from around the island.

The small chapel at the site is dedicated to the invocation of Nossa Senhora da Madre de Deus (Our Lady the Mother of God) and was constructed in 1727, under the initiative of Vital de Bettencourt de Vasconcelos, the great-great grandson of João de Bettencourt. The following year, on 15 June, the Bishop of Angra, D. Manuel Álvares da Costa, passed a charter to establish a cult, owing to "the parameters necessary, bell-tower and doorway towards the road". This last detail implied that the hermitage was a public space, since the door was allows to be open to those who wished to attend the religious services.

The old gate, that gave rise to the patio, the fountain and the entranceway were part of the elaborate changes made by the older owners. Over the main doorway is the coat-of-arms of the Bettencourt family.

The 1980 Azores earthquake caused serious damage to the internal structure of the building, demanding major repairs, consolidation of walls and restore of spaces. Yet, owing to the expense, the family sold the estate to the State, which was restored and re-qualified to serve as the cabinet of the Ministry of the Republic in the Azores.
 
The manor of Madre de Deus was classified as a Imóvel de Interesse Público (Property of Public Interest) by resolution 41/80 (11 June 1980), and included within the central zone of the historic centre of Angra do Heroísmo.

Architecture
The former manorhouse is situated within the limits of the historic centre of Angra do Heroísmo, and is the current official residence and district centre of the Republican representative to the Azores.

It is an example of the larger manorhouses that were constructed in the 17th century, that supported a large rural estate (that extended to the north of the residence). This manor continued to be held by descendants until the 1980 Azores earthquake, when the former property-owners sold the building to the State.

References

Notes

Sources
 
 

Bettencourt family
Madre Deus Manor
Madre Deus
Properties of Public Interest in Portugal